Turnersville may refer to:

Turnersville, New Jersey, an unincorporated community
Turnersville, Tennessee, an unincorporated community
Turnersville, Texas, a town

See also
Turnerville (disambiguation)